Francesca di Foix is a melodramma giocoso (comic opera) in one act by Gaetano Donizetti with a libretto by Domenico Gilardoni based on one by Jean-Nicolas Bouilly and Emmanuel Mercier-Dupaty for Henri Montan Berton's 3-act opéra-comique Françoise de Foix, inspired by the life of Françoise de Foix.

It received its first performance on 30 May 1831 at the Teatro San Carlo, Naples.

Performance history
The opera is chiefly known for having provided segments to other Donizetti operas, including Ugo, conte di Parigi, L'elisir d'amore and Gabriella di Vergy although a complete recording exists on the Opera Rara label.

It was given in London in November 2013, along with Debussy's L'enfant prodigue as a double bill, at the Guildhall School of Music staged by the Australian opera director Stephen Barlow.

Roles

Synopsis 
Time: The Middle Ages
Place: France

The Count is determined to keep his beautiful wife Francesca well away from the temptations of the French court. Knowing the amorous ways of the nobility he tells them that she is unwilling to appear in public because she is extremely ugly.

Unfortunately this raises the interest of the King who despatches one of his gentlemen (the Duke) to investigate, and if he finds that the Countess is beautiful he must lure her back incognito to court.

Sure enough the Duke is able to persuade Francesca to return to Paris with him. Rather than admit his deceit her husband at first refuses to acknowledge who she is. To force his hand the King announces that a tournament is to be held and the winning knight will be given Francesca's hand in marriage.

The Count can no longer keep up his subterfuge and admits that, driven by jealousy, he lied to the King and his courtiers. After due admonishment by the King all is forgiven and the Count and Countess live happily ever after.

Recordings

References
Notes

Cited sources
Ashbrook, William (1982), Donizetti and His Operas, Cambridge University Press.  
 Ashbrook, William (1992). "Donizetti, (Domenico) Gaetano (Maria): work-list" in Sadie 1992, vol. 1, pp. 1215–1218.
 Cook, Elizabeth (1992). "Saint-Amans, Louis Joseph" in Sadie 1992, vol. 4, p. 125.
 Osborne, Charles (1994). The Bel Canto Operas of Rossini, Donizetti, and Bellini. Portland, Oregon: Amadeus Press.  .
 Pitou, Spire (1983–1990). The Paris Opéra: An Encyclopedia of Operas, Ballets, Composers, and Performers (3 volumes). Westport, Connecticut: Greenwood Press. .
 Sadie, Stanley, editor (1992). The New Grove Dictionary of Opera (4 volumes). London: Macmillan. .
 Sadie, Stanley, editor; John Tyrell; executive editor (2001). The New Grove Dictionary of Music and Musicians, 2nd edition. London: Macmillan.  (hardcover).  (eBook).
 Smart, Mary Ann; Budden, Julian (2001), "Donizetti, (Domenico) Gaetano (Maria)" in Sadie.
 Wild, Nicole; Charlton, David (2005). Théâtre de l'Opéra-Comique Paris: répertoire 1762-1972. Sprimont, Belgium: Editions Mardaga. .

Other sources
Ashbrook, William and Sarah Hibberd (2001), in  Holden, Amanda (Ed.), The New Penguin Opera Guide, New York: Penguin Putnam. .  pp. 224 – 247.
Black, John (1982), Donizetti’s Operas in Naples, 1822—1848. London: The Donizetti Society.
 Weinstock, Herbert (1963), Donizetti and the World of Opera in Italy, Paris, and Vienna in the First Half of the Nineteenth Century, New York: Pantheon Books.

External links
  (original at the Naples Conservatorio San Pietro a Majella)
  Libretto for Francesca di Foix 

Operas by Gaetano Donizetti
Italian-language operas
1831 operas
Operas
One-act operas
Opera world premieres at the Teatro San Carlo
Operas set in France